Imperator Aleksandr III (Emperor Alexander III) was the third, and last, ship of the  dreadnoughts of the Imperial Russian Navy. She was begun before World War I, completed during the war and saw service with the Black Sea Fleet. She was renamed  Volia or Volya (Freedom) before her completion and then General Alekseyev in 1920. The ship was delivered in 1917, but the disruptions of the February Revolution rendered the Black Sea Fleet ineffective and she saw no combat.

Volia was surrendered to the Germans in 1918, but they were forced to turn her over to the British by the terms of the Armistice. The British turned her over to the White Russians in 1919 and they used her to help evacuate the Crimea in 1920. She was interned in Bizerte, French Tunisia, by the French and ultimately scrapped by them in 1936 to pay her docking fees. Her guns were put into storage and were later used by the Germans and Finns for coastal artillery during World War II. Both countries continued to use them throughout the Cold War.

Description
Her sister Imperatritsa Mariya had proved to be very bow heavy in service and tended to ship large amounts of water through her forward casemates; Imperator Aleksandr IIIs forward pair of 130 mm guns were removed before she was completed in an attempt to compensate for her trim.

Imperator Aleksandr III was fitted with four Parsons-type steam turbines imported from John Brown & Company of the United Kingdom. All of her electrical power was generated by three Curtis  main turbo generators and two  auxiliary units.

The ship's main armament consisted of a dozen Obukhovskii  Pattern 1907 guns mounted in four triple turrets distributed the length of the ship. Her secondary armament consisted of eighteen  B7 Pattern 1913 guns mounted in casemates. They were arranged in two groups, five guns per side from the forward turret to the rear funnel and the remaining four clustered around the rear turret. She was fitted with four  'Lender' anti-aircraft guns, two each mounted on the roof of the fore and aft turrets. Four  submerged torpedo tubes were mounted, two tubes on each broadside abaft the forward magazine.

Construction and career
Imperator Aleksandr III was built by the Russud Shipyard at Nikolayev. She was laid down on 30 October 1911, but this was just a ceremonial event as her design had not yet been finalized or the contract signed. She suffered from a number of delays during construction. First the method of fastening the armour to its supports was changed and the armour plates were locked together by a type of mortise and tenon joint to better distribute the shock of an impact based on the full-scale armour trials conducted using the hulk of the old pre-dreadnought battleship  in 1913. This added almost  of weight to the ship and raised her cost by 220,000 rubles. Then her priority was reduced after the start of World War I to concentrate efforts on her more advanced sister ships to complete them more quickly. She was not expected to be finished before 1916, but her British-built turbines were also delayed. Imperator Aleksandr III was launched on 15 April 1914, but did not arrive at Sevastopol for fitting out until 17 July 1917, by which time the ship had been renamed Volia  (Freedom). She conducted her sea trials over the next several months. By this time the Black Sea Fleet was totally ineffective as a result of the political situation after the February Revolution and Volia did not see any combat.

Volia sailed from Sevastopol to Novorossiysk on 1 May 1918 to avoid capture by advancing German troops. While at Novorossiysk she received an order to scuttle on 19 June 1918, but the majority of the crew (933 versus 640) refused to do so and decided to return to Sevastopol. Upon arrival she was disarmed and only guards were left on board, but the Germans took control on 1 October. The ship made a brief cruise with a German crew on 15 October, but her guns were still inoperable. Less than a month later the Germans were forced to turn her over to the British on 24 November in accordance with the Armistice when a party from the light cruiser  took charge of her. A month later she was sailed for the port of İzmit, on the Sea of Marmara, by a crew from the pre-dreadnought , which also escorted her.

On 29 October 1919 she was sailed back to Sevastopol by a crew from the battleship  and turned over to the White Russians on 1 November. They renamed her General Alekseyev and carried out shore bombardments with only three of her of twelve guns operable. With the collapse of the White Russian armies in Southern Russia in 1920, the ship helped to evacuate the Whites from the Crimea to Bizerte, where she was interned with the rest of Wrangel's fleet. The French decided not to sell her back to the Soviet Union and she was sold for scrap in the late 1920s to pay her docking costs although she was not actually broken up until 1936.

The ship's guns were placed into storage in Bizerte. In January 1940 France gave them to Finland, after refusing to sell seven to the Finns in the summer of 1939. Of the twelve main guns, eight made it to Finland, while four were seized by Germany when it invaded Norway in April 1940 and captured them on board SS Nina in Narvik harbor. The Germans emplaced all four guns, after rebuilding them to accept German ammunition, in armoured turrets in Batterie Mirus on Guernsey. The Finns used four guns in coastal artillery positions at Isosaari and Mäkiluoto. Two other guns were used to repair Soviet TM-3-12 railway guns abandoned at Hanko when the Soviets evacuated in 1941. After the war, these were handed over to the Soviet Union, where they were kept operational until the 1990s. The remaining two guns were kept as spares for the others, one of which was used to replace one gun damaged during tests with 'super charges' in the 1970s. One gun turret is now a memorial at Isosaari while the remaining spare barrel is preserved at the Finnish Coast Artillery Museum at Kuivasaari.

Nina also carried some of General Alekseyevs 13 cm guns. Several of these were used at the fort at Tangane on the island of Rugsundøy. They engaged the British light cruiser , reportedly scoring one hit on the cruiser, during Operation Archery in 1941, but saw no other combat during the war.

Notes

Footnotes

Bibliography

External links

 Brief article and specification
 Short article from Black Sea Fleet webpage
 Photo gallery of the Isosaari turret

Imperatritsa Mariya-class battleships
World War I battleships of Russia
Wrangel's fleet
1914 ships
Ships built at Shipyard named after 61 Communards
Ships built in the Russian Empire